Media Arts and Communications Academy (or MACA) was a charter school located in McMinnville, Oregon, United States. MACA was a small, tech focused, college preparatory high school option for McMinnville School District students.

History
Media Arts and Communications Academy opened in 2007 as a part of Oregon's Small School Initiative.

In March 2011, the McMinnville School District officially decided to make MACA a "pathway school" and merge it with McMinnville High School (MHS). The move was said to save the district around $350,000.

Students now study visual and broadcast communications through the MHS career pathways programs at McMinnville High School.

Academics
In June 2010 MACA graduated its first high school class, in which 27 students received a high school diploma.

Athletics
Students from the Media Arts and Communications Academy compete as a part of McMinnville High School athletics.

References

Buildings and structures in McMinnville, Oregon
High schools in Yamhill County, Oregon
Public high schools in Oregon
Charter schools in Oregon
2007 establishments in Oregon